In mathematics, the Hopf decomposition, named after Eberhard Hopf, gives a canonical decomposition of a measure space  (X, μ) with respect to an invertible non-singular transformation T:X→X, i.e. a transformation which with its inverse is measurable and carries null sets onto null sets. Up to null sets, X can be written as a disjoint union C ∐ D of T-invariant sets where the action of T on C is conservative and the action of T on D is dissipative. Thus, if τ is the automorphism of A = L∞(X) induced by T, there is a unique τ-invariant projection p in A such that pA is conservative and (I–p)A is dissipative.

Definitions
Wandering sets and dissipative actions. A measurable subset W of X is wandering if its characteristic function q = χW in A = L∞(X) satisfies qτn(q) = 0 for all n; thus, up to null sets, the translates Tn(W) are pairwise disjoint. An action is called dissipative if X = ∐ Tn(W) a.e. for some wandering set W.
Conservative actions. If X has no wandering subsets of positive measure, the action is said to be conservative.
Incompressible actions. An action is said to be incompressible if whenever a measurable subset Z satisfies T(Z) ⊆ Z then  has measure zero. Thus if q = χZ and τ(q) ≤ q, then τ(q) = q a.e.
Recurrent actions. An action T is said to be recurrent if q ≤ τ(q) ∨ τ2(q) ∨ τ3(q) ∨ ... a.e. for any q = χY.
Infinitely recurrent actions. An action T  is said to be infinitely recurrent if q ≤ τm (q) ∨ τm + 1(q) ∨ τm+2(q) ∨ ... a.e. for any q = χY and any m ≥ 1.

Recurrence theorem
Theorem. If T is an invertible transformation on a measure space (X,μ) preserving null sets, then the following conditions are equivalent on T (or its inverse):

 T is conservative;
 T is recurrent;
 T is infinitely recurrent;
 T is incompressible.

Since T is dissipative if and only if T−1 is dissipative, it follows that T is conservative if and only if  T−1 is conservative.

If T is conservative, then r = q ∧ (τ(q) ∨ τ2(q) ∨ τ3(q) ∨ ⋅⋅⋅)⊥ = q ∧ τ(1 - q) ∧ τ2(1 -q) ∧ τ3(q) ∧ ... is wandering so that if q < 1, necessarily r = 0. Hence q ≤ τ(q) ∨ τ2(q) ∨ τ3(q) ∨ ⋅⋅⋅, so that  T is recurrent.

If T is recurrent, then q ≤ τ(q) ∨ τ2(q) ∨ τ3(q) ∨ ⋅⋅⋅ Now assume by induction that q ≤ τk(q) ∨ τk+1(q) ∨ ⋅⋅⋅. Then τk(q) ≤ τk+1(q) ∨ τk+2(q) ∨ ⋅⋅⋅ ≤ . Hence q ≤ τk+1(q) ∨ τk+2(q) ∨ ⋅⋅⋅. So the result holds for k+1 and thus T is infinitely recurrent. Conversely by definition an infinitely recurrent transformation is recurrent.

Now suppose that T is recurrent. To show that T is incompressible it must be shown that, if τ(q) ≤ q, then τ(q) ≤ q. In fact in this case τn(q) is a decreasing sequence. But by recurrence, q ≤ τ(q) ∨ τ2(q) ∨ τ3(q) ∨ ⋅⋅⋅ , so q ≤ τ(q) and hence q = τ(q).

Finally suppose that T is incompressible. If T is not conservative there is a p ≠ 0 in A with the τn(p) disjoint (orthogonal). So T is conservative.

Hopf decomposition
Theorem. If T is an invertible transformation on a measure space (X,μ) preserving null sets and inducing an automorphism τ of A = L∞(X), then there is a unique τ-invariant p = χC in A such that τ is conservative on pA = L∞(C) and dissipative on (1 − p)A = L∞(D) where D = X \ C.

Without loss of generality it can be assumed that μ is a probability measure. If T is conservative there is nothing to prove, since in that case C = X. Otherwise there is a wandering set W for T. Let r = χW and q = ⊕ τn(r). Thus q is τ-invariant and dissipative. Moreover  μ(q) > 0. Clearly an orthogonal direct sum of such τ-invariant dissipative q′s is also  τ-invariant and dissipative; and if q is τ-invariant and dissipative and r < q is  τ-invariant, then r is dissipative. Hence if q1 and q2 are τ-invariant and dissipative, then q1 ∨ q2 is τ-invariant and dissipative, since q1 ∨ q2 = q1 ⊕ q2(1 − q1). Now let M be the supremum of all μ(q) wirh q τ-invariant and dissipative. Take qn τ-invariant and dissipative such that μ(qn) increases to M. Replacing qn by q1 ∨ ⋅⋅⋅ ∨ qn, t can be assumed that qn is increasing to q say. By continuity q is τ-invariant and μ(q) = M. By maximality p = I − q is conservative. Uniqueness is clear since no τ-invariant r < p is dissipative and every τ-invariant r < q is dissipative.

Corollary. The Hopf decomposition for T coincides with the Hopf decomposition for T−1.

Since a transformation is dissipative on a measure space if and only if its inverse is dissipative, the dissipative parts of T and T−1 coincide. Hence so do the conservative parts.

Corollary. The Hopf decomposition for T coincides with the Hopf decomposition for Tn for n > 1.

 If W is a wandering set for T then it is a wandering set for Tn. So the dissipative part of T is contained in the dissipative part of Tn. Let σ = τn. To prove the converse, it suffices to show that if σ is dissipative, then τ is dissipative.  If not, using the Hopf decomposition, it can be assumed that σ is dissipative and τ conservative. Suppose that p is a non-zero wandering projection for σ. Then τa(p) and  τb(p) are orthogonal for different a and b in the same congruence class modulo n. Take a set of τa(p) with non-zero product and maximal size. Thus |S| ≤ n. By maximality, r is wandering for τ, a contradiction.

Corollary. If an invertible transformation T acts ergodically but non-transitively on the measure space (X,μ) preserving null sets and B is a subset with μ(B) > 0, then the complement of B ∪ TB ∪ T2B ∪ ⋅⋅⋅ has measure zero.

Note that ergodicity and non-transitivity imply that the action of T is conservative and hence infinitely recurrent. But then  B ≤ Tm (B) ∨ Tm + 1(B) ∨ Tm+2(B) ∨ ... for any m ≥ 1. Applying T−m, it follows that T−m(B) lies in  Y = B ∪ TB ∪ T2B ∪ ⋅⋅⋅ for every m > 0. By ergodicity μ(X \ Y) = 0.

Hopf decomposition for a non-singular flow
Let (X,μ) be a measure space and St a non-sngular flow on X inducing a 1-parameter group of automorphisms σt of A = L∞(X). It will be assumed that the action is faithful, so that σt is the identity only for t = 0. For each St or equivalently σt  with t ≠ 0 there is a Hopf decomposition, so a pt fixed by σt such that the action is conservative on ptA and dissipative on (1−pt)A.

For s, t  ≠ 0 the conservative and dissipative parts of Ss and St coincide if s/t is rational.

This follows from the fact that for any non-singular invertible transformation the conservative and dissipative parts of T and Tn coincide for n ≠ 0.

If S1 is dissipative on A = L∞(X), then there is an invariant measure λ on A and p in A such that 
 p >  σt(p) for all t > 0
 λ(p – σt(p)) = t for all t > 0 
 σt(p)  1 as t tends to −∞ and  σt(p)  0 as t tends to +∞.

 Let T = S1. Take q a wandering set for T so that ⊕ τn(q) = 1. Changing μ to an equivalent measure, it can be assumed that μ(q)  = 1, so that μ restricts to a probability measure on qA. Transporting this measure to τn(q)A, it can further be assumed that μ is τ-invariant on A. But then  is an equivalent σ-invariant measure on A which can be rescaled if necessary so that λ(q) = 1. The r in A that are wandering for Τ (or τ) with ⊕ τn(r) = 1 are easily described: they are given by r =  ⊕ τn(qn) where q = ⊕ qn is a decomposition of q. In particular λ(r) =1. Moreover if p satisfies p > τ(p) and τ–n(p)  1, then  λ(p– τ(p)) = 1, applying the result to r =  p – τ(p). The same arguments show  that conversely, if r is wandering for τ and λ(r) = 1, then .

Let Q = q ⊕ τ(q) ⊕ τ2 (q) ⊕ ⋅⋅⋅ so that τk (Q) < Q for k ≥ 1. Then  so that 0 ≤ a ≤ 1 in A. By definition  σs(a) ≤ a for s ≥ 0, since . The same formulas show that σs(a) tends 0 or 1 as s tends to +∞ or −∞. Set p = χ[ε,1](a) for 0 < ε < 1. Then σs(p) = χ[ε,1](σs(a)). It follows immediately that σs(p) ≤ p for s ≥ 0. Moreover σs(p)  0 as s tends to +∞ and  σs(p)  1 as s tends to − ∞. The first limit formula follows because 0 ≤ ε ⋅ σs(p) ≤ σs(a). Now the same reasoning can be applied to τ−1, σ−t, τ−1(q) and 1 – ε in place of τ, σt, q and ε. Then it is easily checked that the quantities corresponding to a and p are 1 − a and 1 − p. Consequently σ−t(1−p)  0 as t tends to ∞. Hence σs(p)  1 as s tends to − ∞. In particular p ≠ 0 , 1. 

So r = p − τ(p) is wandering for τ and ⊕ τk(r) = 1. Hence λ(r) = 1. It follows that  λ(p −σs(p) ) = s for s = 1/n and therefore for all rational s > 0. Since the family  σs(p) is continuous and decreasing, by continuity the same formula also holds for all real s > 0.  Hence p satisfies all the asserted conditions. 

The conservative and dissipative parts of St for t ≠ 0  are independent of t.

 The previous result shows that if St is dissipative on X for t ≠ 0 then so is every Ss for s ≠ 0. By uniqueness, St and Ss preserve the dissipative parts of the other. Hence each is dissipative on the dissipative part of the other, so the dissipative parts agree. Hence the conservative parts agree.

See also
Ergodic flow

Notes

References

Ergodic theory
Measure theory